Nordiskt Idrottslif ("Nordic Sporting Life") was a Swedish newspaper devoted to sports, published in Stockholm from 1900 to 1920. It was founded by Clarence von Rosen as a spin off of the sports newspaper Ny Tidning för Idrott and was the leading Swedish sports newspaper during its existence, with a focus on football, athletics, swimming and winter sports. It was published once a week until 1906, and twice weekly thereafter. The newspaper was used as the official means of announcement for the Swedish Sports Confederation.

References

1900 establishments in Sweden
1920 disestablishments in Sweden
Defunct newspapers published in Sweden
Defunct weekly newspapers
Newspapers established in 1900
Newspapers published in Stockholm
Publications disestablished in 1920
Sports mass media in Sweden
Sports newspapers
Swedish-language newspapers
Weekly newspapers published in Sweden